Ernestiini is a tribe of flies in the family Tachinidae.

Genera
Appendicia Stein, 1924
Cleonice Robineau-Desvoidy, 1863
Eloceria Robineau-Desvoidy, 1863
Ernestia Robineau-Desvoidy, 1830
Eurithia Robineau-Desvoidy, 1844
Fausta Robineau-Desvoidy, 1830
Gymnocheta Robineau-Desvoidy, 1830
Hyalurgus Brauer & Bergenstamm, 1893
Loewia Egger, 1856
Zophomyia Macquart, 1835

References

Diptera of Europe
Tachininae